It's Always Rock and Roll is a double LP by Heldon which was released in 1975.

Track listing

Side A
 "ICS Machnique" – 4:11
 "Cotes de cachalot à la psylocybine" – 8:35
 "Méchamment rock" – 3:33
 "Cocaine Blues" – 9:42

Side B
 "Aurore" – 18:13

Side C
 "Virgin Swedish Blues" – 7:27
 "Ocean Boogi" – 5:53
 "Zind Destruction" – 8:22

Side D
 "Doctor Bloodmoney" – 16:49

References

Heldon albums
1975 albums